Villarrica del Espíritu Santo, is a city in Paraguay. Located in the middle of the Oriental Region of the Paraguayan territory, it is the capital of the Guairá Department. It was founded by the Spanish Captain Ruy Diaz de Melgarejo on May 14, 1570.

Villarrica has many places that honor the Paraguayan culture, such as the monument to the memory of Manuel Ortiz Guerrero, honorary citizen of the city. About this city Bacón Duarte Prado (journalist and musician) wrote: Villarrica is the city of the eternal youth, born from the waters of the Ycuá Pytá and the breeze that comes from the hills.

Founded by the Spanish Ruy Diaz de Melgarejo, 350 km east from the Saltos del Guaira, on May 14, 1570, with the name Villa Rica del Espíritu Santo (Villa Rica of the Holy Spirit), finally settled in 1682 in the hills near the Ybytyruzu, part of the Caaguazú Cordillera, 180 m above ocean level.

The city is located near the Ybyturuzú, part of the Caaguazú mountain chain. The land is elevated, rough and wooded, appropriate for the cultivating sugar cane, trees for wood and for raising cattle.

History

In the 16th century, Ruy Díaz de Melgarejo left Ciudad Real with 40 men and 53 horses to the East, where they expected to find mines of gold and silver. After arriving in the lands of Cacique (Chief) Cuaracyberá, he founded a new town on May 14, 1570, and named it Villa Rica del Espíritu Santo, because of the belief that there was abundant gold and silver in the area, and because the timing was near the religious festival Espíritu Santo. Due to constant invasions by Paulist Bandeirantes, the city had to be moved seven times before settling in one place. For this reason it received the name of “Wandering city”.

In 1592, Ruy Díaz de Guzman moved the city 100 km east. In 1599, he moved it again, this time near the Mboteitei River, 100 leagues from Asunción. After long years of peaceful existence, the city was invaded in 1632 by the Mamelucos, and after 4 years of pilgrimage the population settled in the nearby Mbaracayú. Two years later, the Governor Valderrama determined to situate it in the fields of Yarú. In 1642, the population migrated again to Curuguaty.

In 1678, the population settled close to the Tobatyry River, a place called “Espinillo”, but the soil was no good for agriculture so many people decided to organize and do a recognition expedition to the area beyond the Tebicuary River. They found fertile land near Ybyturuzú, so they requested the Governor's authorization to move the city there. On May 25, 1682, he gave licence to establish in Ybyturuzú, only if the King approved it too, which he did on May 14, 1701.  This date became the definite date of foundation. The Franciscan Missioners helped consolidate the city, founding a Guaraní Mission in Itapé.

In 1906, the fourth department of Paraguay was formed, comprising Villarrica, Itapé, Hiaty, Mbocayaty and Yataity. During the 20th century, exploitation of the wood in Caaguazú and the importance of Villarrica as an urban center spurred the creation of a railway crossing the entire department from east to west.

Climate
Villarica has a humid subtropical climate (Köppen Cfa) bordering on a tropical rainforest climate (Af) and a tropical monsoon climate (Am). The rainiest months are January and November.

The neighborhoods are: Ybaroty, San Miguel de Carumbey, Estación, Santa Librada, Santa Lucía, San Blás and Tutytimí.

Economy

The most important economic activities of the department are: agriculture, breeding of small animals, dairy products, the textile industry, commerce and services.

Communications

The department has the Route No. 8 “Blas Garay”, which parts from the joint of Route No. 2 and Route No. 7 and is paved until it reaches Caazapá. There is also another route that joins with Route No. 7, which passes through Mbocayaty, Natalicio Talavera, Troche and Blas Garay.

Education

The city counts with the Catholic University, one of the oldest in the interior of the country. There is also Filial Faculties of the Asunción National University and North University.

It has numerous educational institutions and schools, such as: the National School, the Ortiz Guerreo School, Technical and Vocational National School, the Diosesano Seminar, the Agriculture Regional School, Women Professional Institute, and the Pío XII School of Arts and Crafts.

Culture

Villarrica is regarded by many as the second most important city in Paraguay, due to the number of celebrated exponents in the arts, literature, culture and political thought, which have increased the profile of the city both nationally and internationally. Today, the city is a hub for learning, having a substantial university population. Across the nation, historically, the city's name is synonymous with academia, scientific & cultural accomplishment. For decades, Villarrica has been a place of unusually heavy European immigration (Spaniards, Italians, French, Germans) compared to its neighboring towns and cities. It also receives immigrants from the middle east (Syrians, Lebanese, Iranians, Palestinian). Among the different social, recreational and cultural institutions are “Club Porvenir Guaireño”, “El Centro Español”, “El Club de Leones” (Lions Club), “Instituto de Cultura Hispánica” (Hispanic Culture Institute), “Teatro Municipal” (Municipal Theatre), “Orquesta de Cámara” (Camara Orchestra), “Escuela Municipal de Danza” (Dance School), “Asociación de Productores de Caña de Azúcar” (Sugar Cane Producers Association), “Liga Guaireña de Fútbol” (Guaira Soccer League) and “Liga Guaireña de Basquetbol” (Guaira Basketball League). The city's main football club is the Guaireña F.C.

The city has several radio stations, television cable service and a television station, Channel No. 8.

The people from Guaira preserve in their culture some myths and legends of the original natives, such as the myths of pombero, jasy jateré, kurupi, urutau, karau, jakare, among others.

Among traditions of European origin, the culture includes horse races, religious festivals such as Crucifix Day, cockfights, bullfights and many dance and dress fashions.

Main sights

One of the most visited places is the Manuel Ortiz Guerrero Park (named this way in 1936, before it was called Ycua Pyta).  The park is located in the north of the city, between the neighborhoods of Ybaroty and San Miguel.

Other centers of culture include the “Maestro Fermín López” Municipal Library and Museum, housing personal belongings of Fermín López and Natalicio Talavera; arms and ammunitions from the Chaco War, a collection of Paraguayan coins and bills, as well as other artifacts: native arrows, axes and bows, old furniture, machines, paintings, photographs and pieces of religious art.

Gallery

People from Villarrica
Manuel Ortiz Guerrero
Natalicio de María Talavera
Efraím Cardozo
Helio Vera
Juan Natalicio González
Alfredo Seiferheld
Marcos Zeida
Nadia Ferreira - Top Model International and Miss Universe Paraguay 2021 & historic Runner-up Miss Universe 2021
Lia Ashmore - Miss Universe Paraguay 2022

Twin towns
Villarrica is twinned with:
 San Salvador de Jujuy, Argentina

References

External sources
 Geografía Ilustrada del Paraguay. Tercera Edición. Distribuidora Quevedo de Ediciones. Buenos Aires.1998.
 Atlas y Geografía de Paraguay y el Mundo. Ediciones India Guapa. Asunción. 1997.
 Atlas Paraguay. Cartografía Didáctica. Fausto Cultural Ediciones. Enero 2000.
 Franco Preda, Artemio. El Guairá y su aporte a la cultura paraguaya. Editora Litocolor S.R.L. Villarrica,2003.

External links
 Proyecto Independiente de la Ciudad de Villarrica
 Villarrik.com

 
Populated places in the Guairá Department
Populated places established in 1570
1570 establishments in the Spanish Empire